The Jarvis and Kaplan Cup is an annual inter-provincial team squash tournament that takes place in South Africa (and previously Zimbabwe).

After the death of A.K. Jarvis in 1960 his family donated the trophy, in his memory, for a men's inter-provincial competition. In the same year, Cecil Kaplan and his wife Dorothy donated a trophy for the women's inter-provincial competition. The tournament thereafter became known as the Jarvis and Kaplan Cup.

Through the years other trophies were donated and awarded to eligible recipients. The Gary Thomson trophy is awarded to the province with the best overall results. The Seccie de Villiers award and Clifton-Parks cup is awarded, respectively, to the male and female player who display sportsmanship, tournament support, participate in all events and hold the spirit of the tournament in high regard. The Greg Hammond and Lisa O’Grady trophies are awarded to the most promising men's and women's player. The Lance Sibbald and Glenda Erasmus trophies are awarded to the most improved men's and women's player.

The inaugural tournament took place in 1960 with the women's event played in Johannesburg and the men's event played in Port Elizabeth. The two tournaments were played separately until 1968 when it was decided that both tournaments should be played simultaneously and at the same venue. The host city of the tournament changes every year giving each province the opportunity to host the event.

The tournament is renowned for its traditions and camaraderie.  Such traditions include the filing and sharing of the contents of the Jarvis cup, by the winning team's captain, with every player in the tournament. However, there has been some break from tradition as in recent years the tournament has allowed teams to import a player who holds citizenship outside South Africa.

Men's Team Championship 

Note

 After 1994 Transvaal, Natal, Northern Transvaal became Gauteng, Kwazulu Natal, and Northern Gauteng respectively.
 SADF stands for the South African Defence Force

Jarvis champions by province

Women's Team Championship 

Note

 After 1994 Transvaal, Natal, Northern Transvaal became Gauteng, Kwazulu Natal, and Northern Gauteng respectively.

Kaplan champions by province

Seccie De Villiers Award

Clifton-Parks Award

Greg Hammond Trophy

Lisa O'Grady Trophy

Lance Sibbald Trophy

Glenda Erasmus Trophy

Gary Thomson Trophy

External links 
 http://www.squashsa.co.za/
 http://www.gautengsquash.co.za/
 http://www.squashsite.co.uk/2009/jarviscup2011.htm

Squash tournaments